The Lost World: Jurassic Park is a 1997 pinball game designed by John Borg and released by Sega Pinball. It is based on the 1997 film of the same name.

Description
The playfield contains a T. rex egg as the dominant feature that breaks steadily, ultimately revealing the baby T. rex. The game has five modes, each referring to a scene from the movie, before reaching the  wizard mode: where the T. rex rampages in San Diego.

The pinball machine has an optional 3D lenticular backglass.

See also
Jurassic Park (pinball)
The Lost World: Jurassic Park (video game)
Lost World (pinball)

References

External links
 

Jurassic Park pinball machines
Pinball machines based on films
Sega pinball machines
1997 pinball machines